Glynn Robin "Glyn" Watts (born 16 March 1949) is a British former competitive ice dancer. With his skating partner, Hilary Green, he became the 1974 World silver medalist and a two-time European silver medalist (1974, 1975). They represented Great Britain at the 1976 Winter Olympics, where they placed 7th.

In 1973, they competed at the inaugural Skate Canada International and won the event.

Competitive highlights 
(with Green)

References

1949 births
British male ice dancers
Figure skaters at the 1976 Winter Olympics
Olympic figure skaters of Great Britain
Living people
Sportspeople from London
World Figure Skating Championships medalists
European Figure Skating Championships medalists